Operation Ouch! is a British comedy children's television series on the human body, showing what happens in A&E, what doctors sometimes have problems with and experiments. The first series of Operation Ouch! aired on CBBC in October 2012 and ABC Australia in 2013. The show is hosted by twin brothers and doctors Chris and Xand van Tulleken and in 2019 a new doctor, Dr Ronx, was introduced. Series 9 first aired on CBBC starting May 2020 for one episode, and then resumed on 13 January 2021.

An American remake is currently in development.

Overview 
In order to educate children about medicine and biology, doctors Chris and Xand van Tulleken perform experiments on the human body to see how they work and investigate medical treatments and technology. The doctors also offer "try this at home" experiments for viewers to participate in. In addition, they follow paediatric accident and emergency personnel and patients at Alder Hey Children's Hospital and Royal Manchester Children's Hospital and the Liverpool hospital The Doctors also join West Midlands Ambulance Service and Midlands Air Ambulance rapid response teams on the road and in patients' homes as they assist with medical emergencies.

Production 
The first series has 13 episodes, the first of which aired in October 2012 on CBBC. A second series began in September 2013 and consisted of 10 episodes. A fourth and fifth series was broadcast in 2016 on the CBBC channel in the UK. The seventh and eighth series were both broadcast on CBBC in 2019. A ninth series began airing on CBBC in 2020 with the first episode focussing on COVID-19, and episodes continued from January 2021. The hosts, Chris and Xand van Tulleken, were trained in medicine at the University of Oxford, and both graduated in 2002: Chris is a practicing medical doctor while Xand focuses on research and teaching.

Episode time is 30 minutes for every episode.

Episodes

Series 1 (2012)

Series 2 (2013)

Series 3 (2015)

Series 4 (2016)

Series 5 – Hospital Takeover (2016)

Operation Ouch! Hospital Takeover Live (2016) 
In December 2016, a 2-hour live special was broadcast on the CBBC website hosted by Karim Zeroual. Guests included Cel Spellman and Millie Innes.

Series 6 (2017)

Series 7 (2019)

Series 8 (2019)

Do Try This at Home (2020)

Series 9 (2020-21)

Doctors 

Dr Chris Van Tulleken (Series 1 - Present)

Dr Xand Van Tulleken (Series 1 - Present)

Dr Ronx Ikharia (Series 7 - Present) Note: They did appear in the opening sequence for Season 6, but were never seen.

References

External links 
 

2012 British television series debuts
2010s British children's television series
2010s British medical television series
2020s British children's television series
2020s British medical television series
BBC children's television shows
BBC medical television shows
English-language television shows
CBBC shows
Television series by All3Media